Jerold Joseph Wilson (April 10, 1937 — March 22, 2011) was a Canadian professional ice hockey player and physician. Wilson played three games in the National Hockey League (NHL) for the Montreal Canadiens during the 1956–57 season. His son, Carey Wilson, also played in the NHL, and his grandson Colin was most recently a member of the Colorado Avalanche of the NHL.

Credited with recruiting Swedish hockey stars Anders Hedberg and Ulf Nilsson to the Winnipeg Jets of the World Hockey Association, Wilson is said to be the man most responsible for pioneering the arrival of European hockey players to North America.

He later worked as the team doctor for the Jets and the Winnipeg Blue Bombers of the Canadian Football League. He died on March 22, 2011 in Winnipeg, Manitoba.

References

External links
 

1937 births
2011 deaths
Canadian ice hockey forwards
Ice hockey people from Alberta
Minneapolis Millers (IHL) players
Montreal Canadiens players
Physicians from Manitoba
Ice hockey people from Edmonton
St. Boniface Canadiens players
Winnipeg Canadians players